The diving competition at the 1994 Commonwealth Games in Victoria, British Columbia, Canada counted a total number of six medal events: three events for both men and women.

Medalists

Medal table

Men

Women

Men's results

1 metre springboard

3 metre springboard

10 metre platform

Women's results

1 metre springboard

3 metre springboard

10 metre platform

See also
 Diving at the 1992 Summer Olympics
 Diving at the 1996 Summer Olympics

References
 Results

1994
1994 in water sports
1994 Commonwealth Games events